Gordon Edwin Presgrave (5 January 1915 – 1976) was an English professional footballer who played in the Football League for Carlisle United, Halifax Town and Mansfield Town.

References

1915 births
1976 deaths
English footballers
Association football forwards
English Football League players
Worksop Town F.C. players
Halifax Town A.F.C. players
Carlisle United F.C. players
Mansfield Town F.C. players